Žiga Škoflek (born 22 July 1994) is a Slovenian footballer who plays as a midfielder for Ilirija 1911.

Club career
On 23 August 2019, Škoflek signed with the Russian club Orenburg.

He made his debut in the Russian Premier League for Orenburg on 25 August 2019 in a game against Arsenal Tula, as a starter.

References

External links
 

1994 births
Living people
People from the Municipality of Vojnik
Slovenian footballers
Association football midfielders
NK Šampion players
NK Aluminij players
Stal Mielec players
NK Rudar Velenje players
FC Orenburg players
FC Torpedo Moscow players
NŠ Mura players
ND Ilirija 1911 players
Slovenian Second League players
Slovenian PrvaLiga players
I liga players
Russian Premier League players
Russian First League players
Slovenian expatriate footballers
Expatriate footballers in Poland
Expatriate footballers in Russia
Slovenian expatriate sportspeople in Poland
Slovenian expatriate sportspeople in Russia